Jürgen Fanghänel (born 1 August 1951) is a retired East German amateur boxer, who competed in 1970s and 1980s.

Career 
Fanghänel won the bronze medal in the men's heavyweight division (91 kg) at the 1980 Summer Olympics in Moscow. There he was defeated in the semifinals by Pyotr Zayev of the Soviet Union. Two years earlier he also captured the bronze medal, at the second World Championships in Belgrade. In 1982 he ended up second at the World Championships in Munich, West Germany.

Olympic results 
1972 – Munich
Defeated Atanas Suvandzhiev (Bulgaria) first-round knockout
Lost to Ion Alexe (Romania) by decision, 0–5

1976 – Montreal
Round of 32: Lost to Viktor Ivanov (Soviet Union) by decision, 2–3

 1980 – Moscow
 Round of 16: Defeated Luis Castillo (Ecuador) by decision, 4–1
 Quarterfinal: Defeated Petar Stoimenov (Bulgaria) referee stopped contest in second round
 Semifinal: Lost to Pyotr Zayev (Soviet Union) by decision, 0–5 (was awarded bronze medal)

References 

1951 births
Living people
People from Limbach-Oberfrohna
Olympic boxers of East Germany
Heavyweight boxers
Boxers at the 1972 Summer Olympics
Boxers at the 1976 Summer Olympics
Boxers at the 1980 Summer Olympics
Olympic bronze medalists for East Germany
Olympic medalists in boxing
Medalists at the 1980 Summer Olympics
German male boxers
AIBA World Boxing Championships medalists
Sportspeople from Saxony